João de Casal, O.S.A. (Latin: Joannes do Casal) was a Roman Catholic prelate who served as Bishop of Macau (1690–1735).

Biography
João de Casal was born in Castelo de Vide, province of Alentejo, Portugal in 1641. He was ordained in the Order of Saint Augustine. On 10 Apr 1690, he was appointed during the papacy of Pope Alexander VIII as Bishop of Macau. 
On 25 Jul 1690, he was consecrated bishop by Veríssimo de Lencastre, Archbishop Emeritus of Braga with Agostinho da Anunciação, Archbishop of Goa, and José Saldanha, Bishop of Funchal, serving as co-consecrators. He took possession of the diocese on 20 June 1692. He died on 20 Sep 1735.

Episcopal succession

References

External links
 
  

17th-century Roman Catholic bishops in China
18th-century Roman Catholic bishops in China
Bishops appointed by Pope Alexander VIII
Augustinian bishops
1641 births
1735 deaths
People from Alentejo
People from Castelo de Vide